Ibrahim Muhammad Said (born 15 June 2002 in Nigeria) is a Nigerian footballer who plays as a winger for Danish Superliga club Viborg FF.

Club career

Early years
A product of Dabo Babes Academy in Nigeria, Said made a name for himself in football Europe after his good performance at the 2019 FIFA U-17 World Cup.

Viborg
Although he had bids from other clubs, among others Club Brugge and İstanbul Başakşehir and according to medias, also by English clubs Liverpool and Manchester City, he ended up in Denmark. 18-year old Said, who was described by Nigerian media as the new Victor Moses, ended up signing a 4-year deal with Danish 1st Division club Viborg FF on 21 October 2021.

After a few games for Viborg's U-19 side, Said got his official debut in the Danish 1st Division on 16 April 2021 against Esbjerg fB. Said started on the bench, before replacing Davit Skhirtladze in the 86th minute. Said made a total of three appearances and scored one goal in that season, helping Viborg with promotion to the Danish Superliga for the 2021-22 season.

Said got his debut in the Danish Superliga against FC Nordsjælland on 18 July 2021.

In August 2022, Said and Viborg teammate Alassana Jatta were unable to travel to England for the club's UEFA Europa Conference League play-off against West Ham United due to English entry rules for non-EU citizens after Brexit.

International career
In 2019, he participated in the U-17 World Cup for Nigeria, where he played all four matches, and made himself especially noticeable when he scored a hat-trick in the team's 3-2 victory over Ecuador.

References

External links
 

2002 births
Living people
Nigerian footballers
Nigerian expatriate footballers
Nigeria youth international footballers
Association football wingers
Viborg FF players
Danish 1st Division players
Danish Superliga players
Nigerian expatriate sportspeople in Denmark
Expatriate men's footballers in Denmark